Wenfeng Ge (born 22 April 1987) is a Chinese professional boxer. He held the WBO Oriental Flyweight title after defeating former World Champion Amnat Ruenroeng of Thailand on November 21, 2017, and the WBO International Flyweight Title after defeating Filipino Ivan Soriano last August 24, 2018. Ge challenge Giemel Magramo of the Philippines for the unification of the WBO International and Oriental Flyweight Titles, but failed in a 10th round RTD loss.

Professional boxing record

Titles in boxing 
Regional Titles:
WBO International Flyweight Title   (112 lbs)
WBO Oriental Super Flyweight Title   (115 lbs)
IBF Asia Bantamweight Title    (118 lbs)
Thai Super Flyweight Title  (115 lbs)
WBO China National Bantamweight Title   (118 lbs)

References

External links
 

1987 births
Flyweight boxers
Living people
People from Hebei
Sportspeople from Hebei
People from Shijiazhuang
Sportspeople from Shijiazhuang
Chinese male boxers